Wucheng Township is a township under the administration of Zhangshu, Jiangxi, China, where the Xiushui River enters Lake Poyang. , it has one residential community, 15 villages, and one experimental forest-area neighborhood under its administration.

See also
 Wucheng culture

References 

Township-level divisions of Jiangxi
Zhangshu